Ranjit Singh Brahmpura (8 November 1937 – 13 December 2022) was an Indian politician who was a Member of Parliament, Lok Sabha for Khadoor Sahib constituency, he won the 2014 Indian general election being a Shiromani Akali Dal candidate. He is often referred to as Majhe Da Jarnail (meaning General of Majha in Punjabi). He has previously served as Cabinet Minister in Government of Punjab twice, and MLA four times in Punjab. He was a part of the Shiromani Akali Dal led by Sukhbir Singh Badal until 2019 when he was expelled from the party. On 23 December 2021, he rejoined Shiromani Akali Dal.

References

1937 births
2022 deaths
India MPs 2014–2019
Shiromani Akali Dal politicians
Lok Sabha members from Punjab, India
People from Kapurthala district
Shiromani Akali Dal (Taksali) politicians